Daniel Kartheininger is a Grand Prix motorcycle racer from Germany. He currently competes in the IDM Superbike Championship aboard a Yamaha YZF-R1. He has previously competed in the ADAC Junior Cup, the Red Bull MotoGP Rookies Cup, the German IDM 125 Championship, the IDM Superbike Championship and the 125cc World Championship.

Career statistics

By season

Races by year

References

External links
 Profile on motogp.com

1992 births
German motorcycle racers
Living people
125cc World Championship riders
People from Memmingen
Sportspeople from Swabia (Bavaria)